Gerald Humphry Legge, 9th Earl of Dartmouth FCA (26 April 1924 – 14 December 1997), styled Viscount Lewisham between 1958 and 1962, was a British peer and businessman.

Background and education
Legge was the only son of Humphry Legge, 8th Earl of Dartmouth, and his wife, Roma Ernestine (née Horlick). He was educated at Eton College.

Career
On leaving Eton in 1942, he joined the Coldstream Guards as a Captain and served with them until the end of the Second World War, having been mentioned in despatches. He was subsequently a director of the farming company Rea Bros (based at Ashcombe House) from 1958 to 1989, chairman of the Royal Choral Society from 1970 to 1992 and chairman of the Anglo-Brazilian Society from 1975 to 1994. He succeeded his father in the earldom in 1962.

Family
Lord Dartmouth married Raine McCorquodale, the only child of the romance novelist Barbara Cartland and her first husband, Alexander McCorquodale, on 1 July 1948. They had four children:
 William Legge, 10th Earl of Dartmouth (b. 23 December 1949)
Gerald Glen Kavanagh-Legge (b. 2005)
 The Honourable Rupert Legge (b. 1 January 1951), married Mary Victoria Susan Ottley, daughter of Lionel Edward Bruce Ottley, and had issue:
 Edward Peregrine Legge (b. 1986)
 Claudia Rose Legge (b. 1989)
 Lady Charlotte (b. 16 July 1963), married Don Alessandro Paternò Castello, 13th Duke of Carcaci (b. 1961), and had issue:
 Donna Miranda Marie Patricia Paternò Castello (b. 7 June 1993)
 Donna Chiara Diana Paternò Castello (b. 17 April 1995)
 Don Tancredi Lorenzo Paternò Castello (b. 9 April 1997)
 The Honourable Henry Legge (b. 28 December 1968), married Cressida Hogg (youngest daughter of Sir Christopher Anthony Hogg), on 21 December 1995, and had issue:
 Violet Legge (b. 9 October 2000)
 Olivia Daisy Legge (b. 11 July 2002)
 Hebe Rosalind Legge (b. 24 July 2005)

Lord and Lady Dartmouth divorced in 1976. Lady Dartmouth later married the 8th Earl Spencer and became the stepmother of Lady Diana Spencer (later Princess of Wales), while Lord Dartmouth married Gwendoline May Seguin four years later. Lord Dartmouth died in 1997 and was succeeded by his oldest son, William.

References

External links

1924 births
1997 deaths
Coldstream Guards officers
9
People educated at Eton College
Gerald